Lisle was a type of finish that was applied to obtain smooth and even yarns, largely employed for goods intended for underwear and hosiery. Yarns made with long-staple fibers such as Egyptian cotton were passed repeatedly and swiftly through gas flames. The action removes the fuzzy and protruding fibers. The finish adds smoothness, gloss, and evenness to the yarn. Most often, yarn done with a lisle finish was referred to as " Lisle yarn." or "Lisle thread." These were plied, high-twisted, gassed combed yarns of long-staple cotton. 

Another method of "lisle" was on finishing fabrics, in which hosiery fabric was treated with a weak acid solution like as hydrochloric acid or sulfuric acid, the fabric was then tumble dried without washing at a temperature of a hundred degrees Fahrenheit. The acid and tumble exposure remove the loose ends and fuzziness from the fabric, which is subsequently neutralised with an alkaline solution to prevent further acid damage.

Etymology 
Lisle is derived from the French city Lille, It was formerly known as Lisle and served as a textile hub.

Use 
Lisle was used to manufacture underwear, hosiery, stockings, and sports wear.

See also 
 Aesthetics (textile)

References 

Textile techniques
Textile treatments